The Qingdao–Jinan railway or Jiaoji Railway (formerly the Shantung Railway)  is a railway in Shandong Province, China. Adolph von Hansemann and other German financiers funded construction of the railway, then known as Schantung Eisenbahn Gesellschaft (Shantung Railway Company), which began September 23, 1899, and was completed in 1904. Since the quadruple tracking of this corridor with the opening of the parallel Qingdao–Jinan passenger railway, the line is mostly used for freight with some conventional passenger services.

Rail connections
 Jinan: Beijing–Shanghai railway, Handan–Jinan railway
 Zibo: Zibo–Dongying railway
 Yantai: Lancun–Yantai railway
 Jiaozhou: Jiaozhou–Xinyi railway, Haitian−Qingdao railway

History 

As the Qingdao–Jinan railway could be used to transport a large number of soldiers through the mountainous countryside of the Shandong Peninsula, it was of great military significance during the Warlord Era (1916–1928) and Nanjing decade (1928–1937) of China, as various warlords used it in their conflicts. In late 1932, the railway saw heavy fighting as warlord Han Fuju sought to capture its eastern section from his rival Liu Zhennian during a war for eastern Shandong. Liu's troops managed to beat off the attacks, forcing Han to resort to the region's road network (which was of bad quality at the time) to move his army, significantly prolonging the war. Nevertheless, Han eventually won, unifying all of Shandong under his rule.

It was originally opened by the German-owned Shantung Railway Company, and after the Germans were defeated in China by the Japanese during the First World War, it passed to Chinese control as the Jiaoji Railway Company. After the Japanese occupation of northern China during the Second Sino-Japanese War, the Jiaoji Railway was nationalised and made part of the North China Transportation Company. After the establishment of the People's Republic of China, the railway became part of China Railway.

Between 1959 and 1990, the railway was dualled. Electrification of the railway began in 2003 and was completed in September 2006.

Incidents 
2008 Shandong train collision

References

Bibliography

See also
 Qingdao–Jinan high-speed railway – a new parallel dedicated high-speed railway running north of the  Qingdao–Jinan railway.
 Qingdao–Jinan passenger railway – a new high-speed railway running alongside the Qingdao–Jinan railway.
List of railways in China
Rail transport in the People's Republic of China

Railway lines in China
Rail transport in Shandong
Railway lines opened in 1904